Anisong Chareantham (born April 12, 1988) is a Thai professional footballer who plays as a centre-back for Thai League 2 club Lampang.

Honours
Nongbua Pitchaya
 Thai League 2: 2020–21

References

External links

1988 births
Living people
Anisong Chareantham
Anisong Chareantham
Association football defenders
Anisong Chareantham
Anisong Chareantham
Anisong Chareantham